Sprite Ice is a variant of Sprite first introduced in South Korea in 2002, and Canada and Belgium in 2003. The first flavour variant of The Coca-Cola Company’s popular lemon and lime-flavoured soda, the product gained traction in several countries worldwide before eventually diminishing in availability. It is packaged in clear, blue-capped plastic bottles with blue and silver graphics on their labels. It is also available in 12-can packages.

Different names
Sprite Blue - Korea (since 2002)
Sprite Ice - Australia (2003-2004), Canada, Hong Kong (2003-?), India, Indonesia (2004-2006), Russia (since 2020), Philippines, Taiwan, Singapore
Sprite Ice Cube - Belgium (since 2003)
Sprite Ice Blue - Italy (since 2004), Chile (since 2005) 
Sprite X - Japan
Sprite Icy Mint - China (since 2004)
Sprite Mynta - Sweden (since 2016)
Sprite Ice Mint - Brazil (since 2018)

Ingredients 
Sprite Ice contains carbonated water, pine sap, sugar/glucose-fructose, citric acid, natural flavors, sodium citrate and sodium benzoate.

In Sweden, the drink is sweetened with both normal Sugar and Stevia, reducing the sugar content to 6.6g per 100ml instead of the 10.1g found in unmodified Sprite.

Coca-Cola brands